Othmar Schoeck (1 September 1886 – 8 March 1957) was a Swiss Romantic classical composer, opera composer, musician, and conductor.

He was known mainly for his considerable output of art songs and song cycles, though he also wrote a number of operas, notably his one-act Penthesilea, which was premiered at the Semperoper in Dresden in 1927 and revived at the Lucerne Festival in 1999. He wrote a handful of instrumental compositions, including two string quartets and concertos for violin (for Stefi Geyer, dedicatee also of Béla Bartók's first concerto), cello and horn.

Biography

Early life and career
Schoeck was born in Brunnen, studied briefly at the Leipzig Conservatory with Max Reger in 1907/08, but otherwise spent his whole career in Zürich. His father, Alfred Schoeck was a landscape painter, and as a young man, Othmar seriously considered following in his father's footsteps and attended classes an art school in Zürich before dropping out to go to the Zürich Conservatory.

During World War I Schoeck earned his living in Zurich initially as a chorus director and as a freelance accompanist and conductor. An annuity given him by the Winterthur industrialist Werner Reinhart from 1916 onwards, coupled with the income from his appointment as conductor of the St Gall Symphony orchestra in 1917 (with special permission to remain resident in Zürich), allowed Schoeck to give up choral conducting and devote more time to composition instead.

Influence of Busoni
In 1916, Schoeck became acquainted with Ferruccio Busoni, who had moved to Zurich from Berlin to escape the adverse effects of the war. Busoni was not alone in coming to Zurich. The war had turned "provincial" Zurich, in neutral Switzerland, into an international metropolis. Schoeck was a great admirer of the songs of Hugo Wolf; Busoni disliked them, and he said so. Despite their differences, their relationship quickly developed into one of mutual respect, and even one with a bit of affection. In fact, it was Busoni's suggestion that Schoeck use Ludvig Holberg's Don Ranudo de Colibrados as the subject of an opera.

On 19 June 1917 Philipp Jarnach, a French composer who was also a refugee in Zurich, and an assistant of Busoni, gave Busoni a copy of Martin Buber's book Chinesische Geister- und Liebesgeschichten [Chinese Ghost and Love Stories] (Frankfurt, 1911). Jarnach suggested that one of these short stories might be suitable for an opera. Busoni immediately wrote a libretto, Das Wandbild [The Picture on the Wall], a short scene and pantomime, which he finished eight days later. Jarnach composed a prelude and the first scene, but lost interest and dropped the project. Undaunted, in June 1918 Busoni offered it to Schoeck. Schoeck, who appears to have taken the offer as a sort of challenge, immediately set aside the orchestration of Don Ranudo, and in three days, produced the new opera.

Das Wandbild is set in a Parisian antique shop around 1830. A student, Novalis, is captivated by a picture of a girl hanging on a wall of the shop. The picture comes to life, and in typical Busoni fashion, the scene immediately dissolves into a fantastical Chinese temple. The opera ends with Novalis awaking from his dream-state and escaping from the shop into the reality of the street. It is one of Schoeck's most unusual creations, "almost minimalist in conception."

Stylistic shift
Around 1918 Schoeck's music began a stylistic shift. At this time he became involved with the pianist Mary de Senger, who appears to have had a profound influence on his compositional style. The second act of his next opera, Venus (1919–1921), employs interesting polyrhythmic and bitonal effects. As he became acquainted with the work of Alban Berg and Les six in Paris, he began to feel isolated by his stylistic conservatism. By 1922 his former mentor, Busoni, who was now back in Berlin, wrote a letter to Volkmar Andreae, saying: "Schoeck has completely abandoned me. I have not entirely given him up. He lacks (or lacked) certain ingredients, which are not available at the chemists'. Which should however be manufactured in his own laboratory."

In the summer of 1923 Schoeck visited Arthur Honegger in Paris, and he later participated in the Salzburg ISCM festival. Not long afterwards, his affair with de Senger came to an end. His distress over the breakup, combined with the shock of the new music he had heard in Paris and Salzburg, seems to have led to a new maturity in his compositional style. Two weeks after his affair ended, he composed the song Die Entschwundene (1923), which was "as much a farewell to the tonal world of his previous music as to his departed lover."

Schoeck was not given to overt signs of gratitude, but he dedicated the song cycle Gaselen (1923), the Sonata for Bass Clarinet and Piano (1927–28), and the Suite in A flat for Strings (1945) to Werner Reinhart.

His work with the German poet Hermann Burte on the opera Das Schloss Dürande, for production at the Berlin State Opera, caused great controversy for Schoeck with the Swiss, because of his association with artists of Nazi Germany.  The opera was premiered in Berlin on 1 April 1943 in the presence of Schoeck. Schoeck himself did not harbor Nazi sympathies, but the angry Swiss reaction to his actions damaged his reputation and put great strain on Schoeck.  He suffered a heart attack in March 1944, but continued to compose.

Compositions

Popular culture references
Wier Chrisemer, Teller and Penn Jillette were The Othmar Schoeck Memorial Society for the Preservation of Unusual and Disgusting Music, which later became the Asparagus Valley Cultural Society.

References

Sources
 Beaumont, Antony, ed. (1987). Busoni: Selected Letters, New York: Columbia University Press. .
 Sadie, S., & Tyrrell, J., eds. (2001). The New Grove Dictionary of Music and Musicians. New York: Grove's Dictionaries.
 Walton, Chris (2000). Essay in booklet accompanying the CD The Eye of the Storm: Ferruccio Busoni's Zurich friends & disciples, pp. 3–6. Ramsen, Switzerland: Guild Music Ltd. GMCD 7189.
 Jumeau-Lafond Jean-David, "Venus d'Othmar Schoeck ou le commandement de la statue", in "De l'archet au pinceau", (Dir. Philippe Junod), Payot / University of Lausanne, Lausanne, 1996.
 Chris Walton: Othmar Schoeck. Life and Works. University of Rochester Press, Rochester NY 2009; xvii, 444 p., ill. (Eastman Studies in Music); ; (with Concise work catalogue and discography p. 327-381).

External links

Othmar Schoeck – a 2009 biography of the composer by Chris Walton.
Othmar Schoeck Site
Karadar entry on Othmar Schoeck
Othmar Schoeck String Quartet No.1 in D Major, Op.23-Sound-bites and short bio

1886 births
1957 deaths
Swiss opera composers
Romantic composers
Swiss classical composers
20th-century classical composers
Commanders Crosses of the Order of Merit of the Federal Republic of Germany
Swiss conductors (music)
Male conductors (music)
People from the canton of Schwyz
Zurich University of the Arts alumni
Swiss male classical composers
Male opera composers
20th-century conductors (music)
20th-century male musicians
19th-century male musicians
20th-century Swiss composers